Cram.com (formerly known as Flashcard Exchange) is a web-based application for creating, studying, and sharing flashcards. Users on Cram.com have created over 68 million flashcards.

History
Cram.com was launched by StudyMode after it acquired FlashcardExchange.com and FlashcardDB.com.

FlashcardExchange.com was originally launched in January 2001 by Culley Harrelson.  FlashcardExchange.com was praised by Education World as being "simply designed and intuitive to use".

Usage
Users can create free accounts on the website to create their own flashcards.  On FlashcardExchange.com, users had to pay to print and download flashcards, but all functionality on Cram.com is free.

Flashcards can be created in a number of languages, such as English, French, Spanish, German, Chinese, Polish, and Portuguese. Flashcards are placed into categories, including careers, language, computers, and others.

See also
List of flashcard software

References

External links 
 

American educational websites
Educational software
Spaced repetition software
Internet properties established in 2001